Michael Haas is an American political scientist.

Academic Background
Haas received his cum laude baccalaureate degree from Stanford University in 1959. Yale University awarded him a master's degree in 1960. He received his Ph.D. at Stanford in 1964, under the direction of Robert C. North. All degrees were in political science.

During his last year of work on his doctoral degree, he taught temporarily at San Jose State University from 1963 to 1964. He then accepted a permanent position at the University of Hawaiʻi at Mānoa, where he rose from Assistant Professor to Professor from 1964 to 1971 and remained until 1998.

While on the faculty in Honolulu, he also held temporary positions at Northwestern University, Purdue University, the University of California (Riverside), San Francisco State University, the University of the Philippines, and the University of London.

His research appointments include a United Nations Institute for Training and Research (UNITAR) consultancy at the United Nations Economic and Social Commission for Asia and the Pacific in Bangkok during 1971 and a Fulbright Research Fellowship at the Institute of Southeast Asian Studies on the University of Singapore campus in 1987.

In 1998 he moved to Los Angeles. During the next decade, he held temporary positions at Loyola Marymount University, California State University, Fullerton, California State University, Los Angeles, California State Polytechnic University, Pomona, Rio Hondo College, College of the Canyons, and Occidental College.

In December 2008, he resigned from his latest teaching position to complete George W. Bush, War Criminal? The Liability of the Bush Administration for 269 War Crimes (2009). This book identifies and documents war crimes for which Bush is liable. Nuremberg prosecutor Ben Ferencz wrote a foreword.

References

1938 births
Living people
American political scientists
People from Detroit
Stanford University School of Humanities and Sciences alumni
University of Hawaiʻi faculty
Yale University alumni